This is a list of film series that have nine entries.

A

Angel Guts (aka Tenshi no Harawata)
Angel Guts: High School Co-Ed (1978)
Angel Guts: Red Classroom (1979)
Angel Guts: Nami (1979)
Angel Guts: Red Porno (1981)
Angel Guts: Rouge (1984)
Angel Guts: Red Rope - "Until I Expire" (1987)
Angel Guts: Red Vertigo (1988)
Angel Guts: Red Lightning (1994)
Angel Guts: Night is Falling Again (1994)
American Pie
American Pie (1999)
American Pie 2 (2001)
American Wedding (2003)
American Pie Presents: Band Camp (2005) (V) (spin-off)
American Pie Presents: The Naked Mile (2006) (V) (spin-off)
American Pie Presents: Beta House (2007) (V) (spin-off)
American Pie Presents: The Book of Love (2009) (V) (spin-off)
American Reunion (2012) 
American Pie Presents: Girls' Rules (2020) (V) (spin-off)

B

Battles Without Honor and Humanity (aka Jingi Naki Tatakai)
Battles Without Honor and Humanity (1973)
Battles Without Honor and Humanity: Hiroshima Deathmatch (1973)
Battles Without Honor and Humanity: Proxy War (1973)
Battles Without Honor and Humanity: Police Tactics (1974)
Battles Without Honor and Humanity: Final Episode (1974)
New Battles Without Honor and Humanity (1974)
New Battles Without Honor and Humanity: The Boss's Head (1975)
New Battles Without Honor and Humanity: The Boss's Last Days (1976)
Aftermath of Battles Without Honor and Humanity (1979)
Beach Party
Beach Party (1963)
Muscle Beach Party (1964)
Bikini Beach (1964)
Pajama Party (1964)
Beach Blanket Bingo (1965)
Ski Party (1965)
How to Stuff a Wild Bikini (1965)
The Ghost in the Invisible Bikini (1966)
Back to the Beach (1987)
Bloodfist
Bloodfist (1989)
Bloodfist II (1990) (V)
Bloodfist III: Forced to Fight (1992) (V)
Bloodfist IV: Die Trying (1992) (V)
Bloodfist V: Human Target (1994) (V)
Bloodfist VI: Ground Zero (1995) (V)
Bloodfist VII: Manhunt (1995) (V)
Bloodfist VIII: Trained to Kill (1996) (V)
Bloodfist 2050 (2005) (TV)
Bouif
Le crime du Bouif (1922)
La résurrection du Bouif (1922)
Le filon du Bouif (1922)
Son excellence le Bouif (1922)
Le Bouif errant (1926)

La fille du Bouif (1932)
Le crime du Bouif (1933)
Le Bouif chez les pur-sang (1935)
Le crime du Bouif (1952)

C
Cannon Movie Tales
Snow White (1987)
Beauty and the Beast (1987)
Hansel and Gretel (1988)
Puss in Boots (1988)
Red Riding Hood (1989)
Rumpelstiltskin (1987)
Sleeping Beauty (1987)
The Frog Prince (1986)
The Emperor's New Clothes (1987)
Care Bears ******
The Care Bears Movie (1985)
Care Bears Movie II: A New Generation (1986)
The Care Bears Adventure in Wonderland (1987)
Care Bears: Journey to Joke-a-lot (2004) (V)
The Care Bears' Big Wish Movie (2005) (V)
Care Bears: Oopsy Does It! (2007)
Care Bears: Share Bear Shines (2010) (V)
Care Bears: To the Rescue (2010) (V)
Care Bears: The Giving Festival (2010) (V)

D

Detective Tex
Circumstantial Evidence (1920)
The Wall Street Mystery (1920)
The Bromley Case (1920)
The Trail of the Cigarette (1920)
The Unseen Witness (1920)
The Scrap of Paper (1920)
The Sacred Ruby (1920)
The Triple Clue (1920)
The House of Mystery (1921)
Digimon Adventure *** (A)
Digimon Adventure: Our War Game! (2000)
Digimon Adventure 02: Digimon Hurricane Touchdown!!/Supreme Evolution! 
The Golden Digimentals (2000)
Digimon Adventure tri.: Reunion (2015)
Digimon Adventure tri.: Determination (2016)
Digimon Adventure tri.: Confession (2016)
Digimon Adventure tri.: Loss (2017)
Digimon Adventure tri.: Coexistence (2017)
Digimon Adventure tri.: Future (2018)
Digimon Adventure: Last Evolution Kizuna (2020)
Dot (A)
Dot and the Kangaroo (1977)
Around the World with Dot (1981)
Dot and the Bunny (1984)
Dot and the Koala (1985)
Dot and Keeto (1986)
Dot and the Whale (1986)
Dot and the Smugglers (1987)
Dot Goes to Hollywood (1987)
Dot in Space (1994)
Dracula (Hammer film series)
Dracula (1958)
The Brides of Dracula (1960)
Dracula: Prince of Darkness (1966)
Dracula Has Risen from the Grave (1968)
Taste the Blood of Dracula (1969)
Scars of Dracula (1970)
Dracula AD 1972 (1972)
The Satanic Rites of Dracula (1973)
The Legend of the 7 Golden Vampires (1974)

E

Ernest P. Worrell
Ernest Goes to Camp (1987)
Ernest Saves Christmas (1988)
Ernest Goes to Jail (1990)
Ernest Scared Stupid (1991)
Ernest Rides Again (1993)
Ernest Goes to School (1994)
Slam Dunk Ernest (1995)
Ernest Goes to Africa (1997)
Ernest in the Army (1998)
Eskimo Limon
Eskimo Limon (1978)
Eskimo Limon 2: Yotzim Kavua (1979) 
Eskimo Limon 3: Shifshuf Naim (1981)
Eskimo Limon 4: Sapiches (1982)
Eskimo Limon 5: Roman Za'ir (1984) 
Eskimo Limon 6: Harimu Ogen (1985) 
Eskimo Limon 7: Ahava Tzeira (1987) 
Eskimo Limon 8: Summertime Blues (1988) 
Eskimo Limon 9: The Party Goes On (2001)

H

Hababam Sınıfı
Hababam Sınıfı (1975)
The Chaos Class Failed the Class (1975)
 (1976)
The Chaos Class is on Vacation (1977)
 (1978)
 (1981)
 (2004)
 (2005)
 (2005)
Hart to Hart *
Hart to Hart (1979) (TV) (Pilot of the TV series)
Hart to Hart Returns (1993) (TV) 
Hart to Hart: Home Is Where the Hart Is (1994) (TV) 
Hart to Hart: Crimes of the Hart (1994) (TV) 
Hart to Hart: Old Friends Never Die (1994) (TV) 
Hart to Hart: Secrets of the Hart (1995) (TV) 
Hart to Hart: Two Harts in 3/4 Time (1995) (TV) 
Hart to Hart: Harts in High Season (1996) (TV) 
Hart to Hart: Till Death Do Us Hart (1996) (TV)
Higgins Family
 The Higgins Family (1938)
 My Wife's Relatives (1939)
 Should Husbands Work? (1939)
 The Covered Trailer (1939)
 Money to Burn (1939)
 Grandpa Goes to Town (1940)
 Earl of Puddlestone (1940)
 Meet the Missus (1940)
 Petticoat Politics (1941)

I

Wong⁴ gaa¹ si¹ ze
 Yes, Madam (1985)
 Royal Warriors (1986)
 In the Line of Duty 3 (1988)
 In the Line of Duty 4: Witness (1989)
 Middle Man (1990)
 Forbidden Arsenal (1991)
 Sea Wolves (1991)
 Yes, Madam '92: A Serious Shock (1992)
 Yes Madam 5 (1996)

J

Jane Doe (TV)
Jane Doe: Vanishing Act (2005) (TV)
Jane Doe: Now You See It, Now You Don't (2005) (TV) 
Jane Doe: Til Death Do Us Part (2005) (TV)
Jane Doe: The Wrong Face (2005) (TV)
Jane Doe: Yes, I Remember It Well (2006)(TV) 
Jane Doe: The Harder They Fall (2006) (TV)
Jane Doe: Ties That Bind (2007) (TV)
Jane Doe: How To Fire Your Boss (2007) (TV)
Jane Doe: Eye of the Beholder (2008) (TV)
Jesse Stone (TV)
Stone Cold (2005) (TV)
Jesse Stone: Night Passage (2006) (TV)
Jesse Stone: Death in Paradise (2006) (TV)
Jesse Stone: Sea Change (2007) (TV)
Jesse Stone: Thin Ice (2009) (TV)
Jesse Stone: No Remorse (2010) (TV)
Jesse Stone: Innocents Lost (2011) (TV)
Jesse Stone: Benefit of the Doubt (2012) (TV)
Jesse Stone: Lost in Paradise (2015) (TV)

L
Lightnin' Bill Carson
Lightnin' Bill Carson (1936)
Lightning Carson Rides Again (1938)
Six-Gun Trail (1938)
Code of the Cactus (1939)
Texas Wildcats (1939)
Outlaws' Paradise (1939)
Straight Shooter (1939)
The Fighting Renegade (1939)
Trigger Fingers (1939)

M
Mr. Moto
Think Fast, Mr. Moto (1937)
Thank You, Mr. Moto (1937)
Mr. Moto's Gamble (a.k.a. Mr. Moto's Diary) (1938)
Mr. Moto Takes a Chance (1938)
Mysterious Mr. Moto (1938)
Mr. Moto's Last Warning (1939)
Mr. Moto in Danger Island (1939)
Mr. Moto Takes a Vacation (1939)
The Return of Mr. Moto (1965)

O
Osamu Tezuka's Star System **********
One Million-Year Trip: Bander Book (1978) (TV)
Undersea Super Train: Marine Express (1979) (TV)
Fumoon (1980) (TV)
Bremen 4: Angels in Hell (1981) (TV)
A Time Slip of 10000 Years: Prime Rose (1983) (TV)
Bagi, the Monster of Mighty Nature (1984) (TV)
The Prince of Devil Island: The Three-Eyed One (1985) (TV)
Galaxy Investigation 2100: Border Planet (1986) (TV)
The Tezuka Osamu Story: I Am Son-goku (1989) (TV)

P
The Pink Panther  (original series) ***
The Pink Panther (1963)
A Shot in the Dark (1964)
Inspector Clouseau (1968)
The Return of the Pink Panther (1975)
The Pink Panther Strikes Again (1976)
Revenge of the Pink Panther (1978)
Trail of the Pink Panther (1982)
Curse of the Pink Panther (1983)
Son of the Pink Panther (1993)

R

The Rockford Files **
The Rockford Files: Backlash of the Hunter (1974) (TV)
The Rockford Files: I Still Love L.A. (1994) (TV)
The Rockford Files: A Blessing in Disguise (1995) (TV)
The Rockford Files: If The Frame Fits (1996) (TV)
The Rockford Files: Godfather Knows Best (1996) (TV)
The Rockford Files: Friends and Foul Play (a.k.a. Fieldtrip to a Funeral) (1996) (TV)
The Rockford Files: Punishment and Crime (a.k.a. Night Fishing) (1996) (TV)
The Rockford Files: Murder and Misdemeanors (1997) (TV)
The Rockford Files: If it Bleeds… It Leads (1999) (TV)
Rocky
Rocky (1976)
Rocky II (1979)
Rocky III (1982)
Rocky IV (1985)
Rocky V (1990)
Rocky Balboa (2006) 
Creed (2015) (spin-off)
Creed II (2018) (spin-off)
Creed III (2023) (spin-off)
La risa en vacaciones
La risa en vacaciones (1990) 
La risa en vacaciones 2 (1990) 
La risa en vacaciones 3 (1992) (TV) 
La risa en vacaciones 4 (1994) (TV) 
La risa en vacaciones 5 (1994) (TV)
La risa en vacaciones 6 (1995) (TV)
La super risa en vacaciones 8 (1996) (TV) 
No se puede con la risa (1998) (V) 
De ladito me da risa (1998) (V)

S

The Saint (RKO series)
The Saint in New York (1938)
The Saint Strikes Back (1939)
The Saint in London (1939)
The Saint's Double Trouble (1940)
The Saint Takes Over (1940)
The Saint in Palm Springs (1941)
The Saint's Vacation (1941)
The Saint Meets the Tiger (1943)
The Saint's Return (1953)
 Sniper
 Sniper (1993)
 Sniper 2 (2002) (TV)
 Sniper 3 (2004) (V)
 Sniper: Reloaded (2011) (V)
 Sniper: Legacy (2014) (V)
 Sniper: Ghost Shooter (2016) (V)
 Sniper: Ultimate Kill (2017) (V)
 Sniper: Assassin's End (2020) (V)
 Sniper: Rogue Mission (2022) (V)
Spider-Man (a)
Spider-Man (2002)
Spider-Man 2 (2004)
Spider-Man 3 (2007)
The Amazing Spider-Man (2012)
The Amazing Spider-Man 2 (2014)
Spider-Man: Homecoming (2017)*
Spider-Man: Into the Spider-Verse (2018)
Spider-Man: Far From Home (2019)*
Spider-Man: No Way Home (2021)*

Sūpā Jaiantsu
Super Giant (1957)
Super Giant Continues (1957)
Super Giant - The Mysterious Spacemen's Demonic Castle (1957)
Super Giant - Earth on the Verge of Destruction (1957)
Super Giant - The Artificial Satellite and the Destruction of Humanity (1957)
Super Giant - The Spaceship and the Clash of the Artificial Satellite (1958)
Super Giant - The Space Mutant Appears (1958)
Super Giant Continues - The Devil's Incarnation (1959)
Super Giant Continues - The Poison Moth Kingdom (1959)

T

Torchy Blane
Smart Blonde (1937)
Fly-Away Baby (1937)
The Adventurous Blonde (1937)
Blondes at Work (1938)
Torchy Blane in Panama (1938)
Torchy Gets Her Man (1938)
Torchy Blane in Chinatown (1939)
Torchy Runs for Mayor (1939)
Torchy Blane... Playing with Dynamite (1939)
Tomie 
Tomie (1999)
Tomie: Another Face (1999)
Tomie: Replay (2000)
Tomie: Re-birth (2001)
Tomie: Forbidden Fruit (2002)
Tomie: Beginning  (2005)
Tomie: Revenge (2005)
Tomie vs Tomie (2007)
Tomie Unlimited (2011)

U

Ursus *
Ursus (1961)
La Vendetta di Ursus (The Revenge of Ursus) (1961)
Ursus nella valle dei leoni (Ursus in the Valley of the Lions) (1961)
Ursus e la regazza tartara (Ursus and the Tartar Girl) (1962)
Ursus nella terra di fuoco (Ursus in the Land of Fire) (1963)
Ursus il gladiatore rebelle (Ursus The Rebel Gladiator) (1963)
Ursus il terrore dei kirghisi (Ursus, the Terror of the Kirghiz) (1964)
Gli Invincibili Tre (The Invincible Three) (1964)
Ercole, Sansone, Maciste e Ursus gli invincible (Hercules, Samson, Maciste and Ursus: the Invincibles) (1964)

W

Wallander (1994 series)
Faceless Killers (a.k.a. Mördare utan ansikte) (1994) 
The Dogs of Riga (a.k.a. Hundarna i Riga) (1995) 
The White Lioness (a.k.a. Den Vita lejoninnan) (1996) 
Sidetracked (a.k.a. Villospår) (2001) 
The Fifth Woman (a.k.a. Den 5e kvinnan) (2002) 
The Man Who Smiled (a.k.a. Mannen som log) (2003) 
One Step Behind (a.k.a. Steget efter) (2005) 
Firewall (a.k.a. Brandvägg) (2006) 
The Pyramid (a.k.a. Pyramiden) (2007) (V)

09